The girls' singles section of the 2007 Sony Ericsson Open (also known as the "2007 Miami Masters"), a tennis tournament, was won by the first seed Sorana Cîrstea of Romania.

Seeds
All seeds receive a bye into the second round.

  Sorana Cîrstea (champion)
  Naomi Cavaday (quarterfinals, retired)
  Anastasia Pivovarova (final)
  Tamaryn Hendler (quarterfinals)

Draw

Finals

External links
Draw

2007 Sony Ericsson Open